The David Bowie Heathen Tour was a 2002 concert tour in support of the album, Heathen, and was also notable for the performances of all songs from the 1977 Low album.

History
The Low album, not previously performed live in its entirety, was premiered on 11 June 2002 at the Roseland Ballroom in New York City, together with all the songs from the Heathen album. With other commitments ruling out the possibility of a major concert tour, the Heathen Tour became a mini-concert tour similar to the 1996 Outside Summer Festivals Tour.

On 11 February 2002, it was announced that Bowie had accepted the role of Artistic Director at the Meltdown Festival, an annual music and arts event held at the South Bank complex in
London, England. David Bowie's Meltdown 2002 ran from 14 to 30 June, with a schedule of concerts and events including performances by The Legendary Stardust Cowboy, Coldplay, The Waterboys and a London Sinfonietta performance of Philip Glass's Low and Heroes symphonies. The closing night was billed as The New Heathens Night with Bowie headlining the event with support by The Dandy Warhols followed by a DJ set from Jonathan Ross.

The Heathen Tour proper began at the Meltdown Festival with Bowie embarking on a series of European performances including a link-up with Moby for the 12-date North America Area:2 Festivals with a return to Europe for a further six performances. Before returning again to North America to perform a final seven shows with the first five in each of New York City's five boroughs, dubbed The New York Marathon Tour by Bowie, who joked "I could get home from all the gigs on roller skates".

Setlist 

The following set list was obtained from the concert held on 11 October 2002 at The Music Hall at Snug Harbour in New York City. It does not represent all concerts for the duration of the tour. 

"Life on Mars?"
"Ashes to Ashes"
"Breaking Glass"
"Cactus" (Pixies song)
"China Girl" (Iggy Pop song)
"Slip Away"
"Fame"
"I'm Afraid of Americans"
"Speed of Life"
"5:15 The Angels Have Gone"
"I've Been Waiting for You" (Neil Young song)
"Survive"
"Rebel Rebel"
""Heroes""
"Heathen (The Rays)"
Encore
"Sunday"
"I Would Be Your Slave"
"Afraid"
"Everyone Says 'Hi'"
"Hallo Spaceboy"
"Let's Dance"
"Ziggy Stardust"

Tour dates

Notes

Tour band

David Bowie – vocals, guitar, saxophone, harmonica, stylophone
Earl Slick – guitar
Gerry Leonard  – guitar, keyboards, backing vocals
Mark Plati – guitar, bass guitar, keyboards, backing vocals
Gail Ann Dorsey – bass guitar, guitar, tambourine (on "Heathen (The Rays)"), backing vocals
Sterling Campbell – drums, percussion
Mike Garson – keyboards
Catherine Russell – keyboards, percussion, backing vocals

Songs

From David Bowie
 "Space Oddity"
From Hunky Dory
 "Changes"
 "Life on Mars?"
 "The Bewlay Brothers"
From The Rise and Fall of Ziggy Stardust and the Spiders from Mars
 "Moonage Daydream"
 "Starman"
 "Ziggy Stardust"
From Diamond Dogs
 "Rebel Rebel"
From Young Americans
 "Fame" (Bowie, John Lennon, Carlos Alomar)
From Station to Station
 "Stay"
From Low
 "Speed of Life"
 "Breaking Glass" (Bowie, Dennis Davis, George Murray)
 "What in the World"
 "Sound and Vision"
 "Always Crashing in the Same Car"
 "Be My Wife"
 "A New Career in a New Town"
 "Warszawa" (Bowie, Brian Eno)
 "Art Decade"
 "Weeping Wall"
 "Subterraneans"
From "Heroes"
 ""Heroes"" (Bowie, Eno)
From Lodger
 "Look Back in Anger" (Bowie, Eno)

From Scary Monsters (and Super Creeps)
 "Ashes to Ashes"
 "Fashion"
From Let's Dance
 "China Girl" (originally from The Idiot (1977) by Iggy Pop; written by Pop and Bowie)
 "Let's Dance"
From Outside
 "Hallo Spaceboy" (Bowie, Eno)
From Earthling
 "I'm Afraid of Americans" (Bowie, Eno)
From Hours
 "Survive" (Bowie, Gabrels)
From Heathen
 "Sunday"
 "Cactus" (originally from Surfer Rosa (1989) by the Pixies; written by Black Francis)
 "Slip Away"
 "Slow Burn"
 "Afraid"
 "I've Been Waiting for You" (originally from Neil Young (1968) by Neil Young; written by Young)
 "I Would Be Your Slave"
 "I Took a Trip on a Gemini Spaceship" (originally by Norman Carl Odam)
 "5:15 the Angels Have Gone"
 "Everyone Says 'Hi'"
 "A Better Future"
 "Heathen (The Rays)"
Other songs:
 "Absolute Beginners" (from the Absolute Beginners soundtrack; written by Bowie)
 "Alabama Song" (released as a non-album single (1980); originally from Bertolt Brecht's opera Rise and Fall of the City of Mahagonny (1930); written by Brecht and Kurt Weill)
 "I Feel So Bad" (originally by Chuck Willis in 1953 and covered and released as a B-side to the "Wild in the Country" single (1961) by Elvis Presley; written by Willis)
 "One Night" (originally a single (1958) by Presley; written by Dave Bartholomew, Pearl King and Anita Steiman)
 "White Light/White Heat" (from White Light/White Heat (1968) by The Velvet Underground; written by Lou Reed)

References

Nicholas Pegg, The Complete David Bowie, Reynolds & Hearn Ltd, 2004, 

David Bowie concert tours
2002 concert tours